London Buses route 37 is a Transport for London contracted bus route in London, England. Running between Peckham and Putney Heath, it is operated by London Central.

History
Five AEC Regent double deck buses with open tops were ordered by Charles Pickup for route 37 on weekdays in 1932, now running between Peckham and Richmond. It was later extended to Hounslow, and during World War I was operated with naptha powered vehicles.

In April 1997 the route gained a night bus variant, route N37. It was the 50th night bus route to begin operation in London.

Current route
Route 37 operates via these primary locations:
Peckham bus station 
Peckham Rye station  
East Dulwich
North Dulwich station 
Herne Hill station 
Brixton
Clapham Common station 
Clapham Junction station  
Wandsworth High Street
East Putney station 
Putney station 
Putney Heath Green Man

References

External links

Timetable

Bus routes in London
Transport in the London Borough of Lambeth
Transport in the London Borough of Southwark
Transport in the London Borough of Wandsworth